Jeleel Olasunkanmi Ojuade is Nigerian professor of dance studies, first Yoruba Professor of Dance in Nigeria and the Vice-Chancellor of the Crown-Hill University, Ilorin since January 2023.

Ojuade was appointed a professor in 2019 at the University of Ilorin and conferred the title, Aare Alasa of Ifetedo by the Olubosin of Ifetedo, Oba Akinola Oyetade Akinrera (Latiri 1).

Life 
Professor Jeleel Ojuade is a native of Ifetedo in Osun state, one of the western states in Nigeria.  He was born in 1970.His early childhood life was spent at Ifetedo but he had the opportunity to travel, accompanying his father's troupe to different states across Nigeria. As a child, he participated in the Festival of Arts and Culture which took place in Lagos Nigeria in 1977. The event which is also regarded as  FESTAC '77 was the Second World Black and African Festival of Arts and Culture. As a teenager, he participated  in dance performances both at the local and state levels.

He obtained a first degree and masters degree in Performing Arts from the University of Ilorin but obtained a PhD in Performance Studies (with the specialization in dance) from the Institute of African Studies, University of Ibadan. Ojuade also obtained a degree in Common Law  (LL.B Hons) and a Masters degree in Copyright Laws (LL.M ) both from the University of Ilorin.

References 

Living people
University of Ibadan alumni
Nigerian people in arts occupations
Nigerian people of African descent
University of Ilorin alumni
1969 births